Abdel Slem Billel Omrani (born 2 June 1993) is a professional footballer who plays as a forward for Liga I club FCSB.

A product of the Marseille academy, Omrani made his Ligue 1 debut for the club in 2011. He amassed ten games for the first team and had a loan stint at Arles-Avignon, before moving to Romania with CFR Cluj in 2016. In the latter country, Omrani won seven domestic trophies and was named the league's Foreign Player of the Year in 2019. He moved to rivals FCSB on a free transfer in 2022.

Born in France, Omrani represented the nation at under-17, under-18 and under-19 levels. In June 2022, he switched his allegiance to Algeria by making his full debut in a 2–1 friendly win over Iran.

Club career

Early career / Marseille
Omrani joined the youth system of Marseille in 2007, after spells with two amateur clubs in the Moselle area. On 19 March 2011, he agreed to a three-year professional contract with the Stade Vélodrome side.

Omrani was subsequently promoted to the senior squad by manager Didier Deschamps for the 2011–12 season, being assigned the number 25 shirt. He made his senior debut by coming on as an 83rd-minute substitute for Alou Diarra in a 1–1 Ligue 1 draw with Brest, on 2 October 2011.

CFR Cluj
Omrani moved abroad for the first time by signing a contract with Romanian team CFR Cluj in September 2016. On the 17th that month, he recorded his debut and scored in a 5–0 Liga I thrashing of Voluntari.

Omrani totalled nine goals from 31 appearances in all competitions during the following season, as "the White-Burgundies" won the national championship. On 8 July 2018, amid rumours regarding a transfer to title contenders FCSB, CFR announced that he penned down a three-year contract extension. Six days later, Omrani obtained the penalty kick from which Emmanuel Culio scored the only goal of the 2018 Supercupa României win over Universitatea Craiova.

In 2019, Omrani was linked with a move to Celtic after netting against them twice in the third qualifying round of the UEFA Champions League, but nothing came of it. That year, he was handed the Foreign Player of the Year award by the Gazeta Sporturilor daily.

Omrani left Cluj-Napoca as a free agent in the summer of 2022, after aiding the team in winning five national titles and two supercups during his six-year stint.

FCSB
On 13 September 2022, Omrani continued in Romania and its Liga I by signing a one-year contract with the option of another two years with FCSB.

International career

France
Omrani is a former France youth international, having represented the country at under-17, under-18 and under-19 levels. With the under-17 side, he played at the 2010 UEFA European Championship.

Algeria
Omrani was also eligible to represent Algeria, and in October 2011 was called up to the under-23 team to participate in the friendly matches ahead of the 2011 CAF Championship. However, the report of the call-up was deemed erroneous due to a misunderstanding between the team's coach and the Algerian media; the latter assumed the coach was calling up Omrani, when he was in fact calling up another French-born player who was also featuring for Marseille.

In February 2013, Omrani was invited by the Algeria under-20 national team coach Jean-Marc Nobilo to be a member of the squad for the 2013 African Championship, but declined the offer. In May 2022, he received his first call-up to the Algeria senior team for the 2023 AFCON qualification matches against Uganda and Tanzania. He made his debut on 12 June, coming on for Rachid Ghezzal in the 71st minute of a 2–1 friendly win against Iran in Doha.

Personal life
Omrani's elder brother Abdelhakim  also played professional football in Romania for Dunărea Călărași, and his elder sister  Yasmina was an international heptathlete.

Career statistics

Club

International

Honours
Marseille
 Coupe de la Ligue: 2011–12
 Trophée des Champions: 2011

Marseille B
 CFA 2 — Group Provence-Alpes-Côte d'Azur-Corsica: 2012–13

CFR Cluj
Liga I: 2017–18, 2018–19, 2019–20, 2020–21, 2021–22
Supercupa României: 2018, 2020; runner-up: 2021

Individual
Gazeta Sporturilor Foreign Player of the Year in Romania: 2019

References

External links

Marseille official profile 

1993 births
Living people
People from Forbach
Sportspeople from Moselle (department)
Footballers from Grand Est 
French sportspeople of Algerian descent
French footballers
Algerian footballers
Association football forwards
Ligue 1 players
Ligue 2 players
Olympique de Marseille players
AC Arlésien players
Liga I players
CFR Cluj players
FC Steaua București players
France youth international footballers
Algeria international footballers
French expatriate footballers
Algerian expatriate footballers
Expatriate footballers in Romania
French expatriate sportspeople in Romania
Algerian expatriate sportspeople in Romania